Rocky Mount Academy is a private school in Rocky Mount, North Carolina, United States.  It serves 409 students in grades PK–12.

History
Rocky Mount Academy was founded in 1968 as a segregation academy. In 1975, the New York Times reported that many of the academy's students would prefer to attend racially integrated public schools, but were not permitted to do so by their parents.

Athletics
Rocky Mount Academy won the state championship in both football and soccer in 2017.

Notable alumni 
Adrian H. Wood, American educator and writer

References

Private schools in North Carolina
Preparatory schools in North Carolina
Private elementary schools in North Carolina
Private middle schools in North Carolina
Private high schools in North Carolina
Segregation academies in North Carolina
Educational institutions established in 1968
1968 establishments in North Carolina
Schools in Nash County, North Carolina
Schools accredited by the Southern Association of Colleges and Schools